Lastarriaea is a genus of plants in the family Polygonaceae with three species. One is native to western North America, and the other two are found in southern South America.

Species
Lastarriaea chilensis
Lastarriaea coriacea - leather spineflower
Lastarriaea ptilota

References

External links 
 Jepson Manual Treatment
 Flora of North America Genus Treatment

Polygonaceae genera